National Route 105 is a national road in the SW of Misiones Province, Argentina. The road is marked in red in the map.

Before Decree #1595 of 1979, Provincial Route 1 went from Villalonga to Azara, going through San José and Apóstoles. The aforementioned decree transferred the road north of Route 14 to federal jurisdiction.

Milestones:
Capital Department: Villalonga (km 0), Parada Leis (km 16), junction provincial route 205 in Fachinal (km 21)
Toll booth in Fachinal (km 23)
Apóstoles Department: Pindapoy (km 34) and San José

Management
The Dirección Provincial de Vialidad (Provincial Dept. of Transportation) has the concession to manage and maintain this road. In 2002 it installed the toll booths in Fachinal.

History
Before 1979 there was another road with this number in the province. It went from Santa Ana to the small town of Santa Rita, crossing through the town of Oberá, shown in green on the map. Federal Law #23153 of 9 November 1984 transferred jurisdiction of the road to the federal government and renamed it as National Route 103, as another route already had the number 105 on the west side of Misiones Province. It was transferred back to the province in 1993 and is today part of route 103. The paving of the section between Oberá and Alba Posse was done after the transfer.

References

National roads in Misiones Province
Tourism in Argentina